Griffen Molino (born January 21, 1994) is an American professional ice hockey forward who is currently an unrestricted free agent. He most recently played with the Utah Grizzlies in the ECHL. He has previously played in the National Hockey League with the Vancouver Canucks.

Playing career 
Molino first played junior hockey in the Little Caesars hockey program in Michigan. As a youth, he played in the 2006 and 2007 Quebec International Pee-Wee Hockey Tournaments with the Little Caesers minor ice hockey team. He enjoyed stints with the Brockville Braves in the Central Canada Hockey League, the Sioux Falls Stampede and Muskegon Lumberjacks of the United States Hockey League before committing to a collegiate career with Western Michigan University.

Molino played for the Western Michigan Broncos from 2015 to 2017.

After his sophomore season with the Broncos in 2016–17, Molino ended his collegiate career in signing as an undrafted free agent with the Vancouver Canucks to a two-year entry-level contract on March 28, 2017. He immediately joined the Canucks playing roster, and made his professional and NHL debut three days later in a 2–0 defeat to the Los Angeles Kings.

In his first full professional season in the 2017–18 season, Molino was assigned to the Canucks AHL affiliate, the Utica Comets. Molino suffered through injury and a lack of form resulting in an unimpressive rookie campaign with 3 goals and 10 points in 46 games. In the off-season Molino was not tendered a qualifying offer by the Canucks and was free to pursue free agency on June 25, 2018.

Unable to secure another NHL offer, Molino agreed to a one-year AHL contract with reigning champions, the Toronto Marlies, on July 5, 2018. In the 2018–19 season, Molino was unable to establish himself within the Marlies, appearing in 36 games producing 4 points. He was re-assigned through the season to play in the ECHL with affiliate, the Newfoundland Growlers, registering 6 points in 10 games.

As a free agent from the Marlies, Molino opted to continue his career in the ECHL, agreeing to a contract with the Utah Grizzlies on August 5, 2019.

Career statistics

References

External links 
 

1994 births
Living people
American men's ice hockey centers
Colorado Eagles players
Muskegon Lumberjacks players
Newfoundland Growlers players
Ontario Reign (AHL) players
Sioux Falls Stampede players
Toronto Marlies players
Undrafted National Hockey League players
Utah Grizzlies (ECHL) players
Utica Comets players
Vancouver Canucks players
Western Michigan Broncos men's ice hockey players
Ice hockey players from Michigan
People from Trenton, Michigan